Labrecque is a municipality in Quebec, Canada.

History
The first settlers to Labrecque arrived in 1917. In 1920, the Labrecque Township was proclaimed, and in 1925 the municipality was incorporated, both named after Michel-Thomas Labrecque (1849-1932), who was the third bishop of Chicoutimi from 1892 to 1928. The first mayor was Jean-Batiste Maltais. The first industry, a sawmill, came into operation in 1921, and the post office opened in 1923.

Demographics
Population trend:
 Population in 2011: 1215 (2006 to 2011 population change: -6.2%)
 Population in 2006: 1295
 Population in 2001: 1288
 Population in 1996: 1224
 Population in 1991: 1179

Private dwellings occupied by usual residents: 470 (total dwellings: 694)

Mother tongue:
 English as first language: 0%
 French as first language: 100%
 English and French as first language: 0%
 Other as first language: 0%

See also
 List of municipalities in Quebec

References

Municipalities in Quebec
Incorporated places in Saguenay–Lac-Saint-Jean